Round Lake State Park is a public recreation area located  southwest of Sagle in Bonner County, Idaho. The  state park surrounds  Round Lake. The lake was formed from glacial activity in the Pleistocene. The park offers campsites, fishing, swimming, boating for non-motorized and electric-powered watercraft, and trails for hiking, biking and skiing.

Wildlife
This state park is home to black bear, moose, grizzly bear, waterfowl, beaver, various songbirds, and deer.

See also

 List of Idaho state parks
 National Parks in Idaho

References

External links
Round Lake State Park Idaho Parks and Recreation
Round Lake State Park Map Idaho Parks and Recreation

State parks of Idaho
Protected areas of Bonner County, Idaho
Protected areas established in 1965
Lakes of Idaho